The 2020–21 Troy Trojans men's basketball team represented Troy University in the 2020–21 NCAA Division I men's basketball season. The Trojans, led by second-year head coach Scott Cross, played their home games at Trojan Arena in Troy, Alabama as members of the Sun Belt Conference. With the creation of divisions to cut down on travel due to the COVID-19 pandemic, they played in the East Division.

Previous season
The Trojans finished the 2019–20 season 9–22, 5–15 in Sun Belt play to finish in a tie for 11th place. They failed to qualify for the Sun Belt tournament.

Roster

Schedule and results

|-
!colspan=12 style=| Non-conference Regular season

|-
!colspan=12 style=| Conference Regular season

|-
!colspan=12 style=| Sun Belt tournament
|-

Source

References

Troy Trojans men's basketball seasons
Troy Trojans
Troy Trojans men's basketball
Troy Trojans men's basketball